Masino Castle ( is a hill-top castle located in Caravino, Italy.

History 
The castle's existence is documented as far back as 1070. Its original owner was the Valperga dynasty, which, legend has it, were descended from Arduino, the first king of Italy. Due to its strategic location, the castle was besieged and damaged several times throughout its existence, including by the House of Savoy in the 14th century, by the French in the 15th century, and by the Spanish in the 16th century.
The castle was later converted into an aristocratic residence.

In 1988, the property was acquired by the Fondo Ambiente Italiano.

Description 
The castle lies on the top of a morainic relief rising from the Ivrea Plain at the foothills of the Alps. The property includes extensive gardens.

The structure features a quadrangular plan with an imposing keep.

Gallery

References

External links

Castles in Piedmont